Cyclopropylacetylene is an hydrocarbon with the chemical formula . Under normal conditions, the substance is a colorless liquid. Cyclopropylacetylene is a precursor pharmaceuticals and other organic compounds.

Synthesis
Several methods have been published on the synthesis of cyclopropylacetylene. The earliest preparation starts with the chlorination of cyclopropylmethylketone with phosphorus pentachloride. Thereafter, the reaction product, 1-cyclopropyl-1,1-dichloroethane, is converted into cyclopropylacetylene via double dehydrochlorination. This occurs in presence of a strongly basic solution, such as potassium tert-butoxide in dimethyl sulfoxide:

However, the yield of this method is not substantial (20-25%). A one-pot synthesis of cyclopropylacetylene has been reported in which 5-chloro-1-pentyne reacts with n-butyl lithium or n-hexyl lithium. Cyclohexane is used as a solvent. The reaction is a metalation followed by a cyclization. The reaction product is then cooled, and an aqueous solution of ammonium chloride is added slowly. There is a two-phase mixture: a heavy water phase and a lighter organic phase containing cyclopropylacetylene.

Applications
Cyclopropylacetylene is used as reagent in organic reactions. It is, for example, a building block of the antiretroviral and psychotropic drug efavirenz. It can also be used in the azide-alkyne Huisgen cycloaddition.

References

Ethynyl compounds
Cyclopropyl compounds